Yekaterina Aleksandrovna Bakhvalova (born 8 March 1972 in Leningrad, Soviet Union) is a retired Russian athlete who specialised in the 400 metres hurdles. She represented her country at the 2004 Summer Olympics narrowly missing the final.

Her personal best in the event is 54.65 seconds, set in 1999.

International competitions

See also
List of World Athletics Championships medalists (women)
List of European Athletics Championships medalists (women)
4 × 400 metres relay at the World Championships in Athletics

References

1972 births
Living people
Athletes from Saint Petersburg
Russian female hurdlers
Olympic female hurdlers
Olympic athletes of Russia
Athletes (track and field) at the 2004 Summer Olympics
Universiade gold medalists for Russia
Universiade silver medalists for Russia
Universiade gold medalists in athletics (track and field)
Medalists at the 1997 Summer Universiade
Goodwill Games medalists in athletics
Competitors at the 1998 Goodwill Games
World Athletics Championships athletes for Russia
World Athletics Indoor Championships winners
European Athletics Championships medalists
Russian Athletics Championships winners